The Many Moods of Murry Wilson is the only record by American songwriter and talent manager Murry Wilson. The album was released on Capitol Records in October 1967, the same record label that the Beach Boys were contracted to at the time. According to Nik Venet, "Capitol made a whole album and released it [for Murry] ... just so they could satisfy him and so he wouldn't hassle them so much on some of the Beach Boys things."

One track, "Italia", was composed by Al Jardine. He later wrote, "I wrote it in '63 and it was originally called 'Pink Champagne.'  Brian liked it so much, he played it for his Dad who said it reminded him of Italy with its European feel.  Murry recorded it with the Capitol Records Orchestra and changed the title to 'Italia.'"

In November 1967, Murry embarked on a month-long tour of Europe and the UK to promote the album. He told Britain's Disc & Music Echo that "after 'Good Vibrations' Brian lost a lot of confidence. He didn't think he could ever write anything as good as that again ... With [my] LP I'm going to nudge my boys' competitive spirit."

Track listing
"Love Won't Wait" (Murry Wilson) – 3:12
"The Happy Song" (Eck Kynor) – 2:04
"The Warmth of the Sun" (Brian Wilson, Mike Love) – 2:45
"Broken Heart" (George Kizanis) – 2:08
"Leaves" (M. Wilson) – 2:40
"The Plumbers Tune" (Kynor) – 2:20
"Painting with Teardrops" (M. Wilson) – 2:32
"Islands in the Sky" (Rick Henn) – 2:51
"Just 'Round the River Bend" (Don Ralke, Deeda Patrick) – 2:09
"Italia" (Al Jardine) – 2:28
"Heartbreak Lane" (M. Wilson) – 2:41
"Betty's Waltz" (M. Wilson, Audree Wilson) – 1:49

References

1967 debut albums
Capitol Records albums
Murry Wilson albums
Albums produced by Brian Wilson
Albums produced by Murry Wilson
Albums recorded at Gold Star Studios
Albums recorded at United Western Recorders